= Trade unions in Thailand =

International Labour Organization
- Thailand is a member of the ILO

Trade unions in Thailand are relatively small, with membership of about two percent of the working population. The first trade union, the United Trade Workers of Thailand, was founded in 1947. Unions were at their peak during the period between 1973 and 1976, led by the Trade Union Group of Thailand (TUGT) and the Labour Coordination Centre of Thailand (LCCT). The relative weakness of the unions outside that period has made activity by workers to improve poor working conditions difficult, especially in the toy and garment industries.
